Zibane Ngozi (born 31 October 1992) is a Botswana athlete. He competed in the men's  relay event at the 2019 World Athletics Championships as well as the men's  relay event at the 2020 Summer Olympics, in which he won the bronze medal.

References

External links
 

1992 births
Living people
Botswana male sprinters
Athletes (track and field) at the 2020 Summer Olympics
Medalists at the 2020 Summer Olympics
Olympic bronze medalists in athletics (track and field)
Olympic bronze medalists for Botswana
Olympic athletes of Botswana
Place of birth missing (living people)
World Athletics Championships athletes for Botswana
Athletes (track and field) at the 2019 African Games
African Games gold medalists for Botswana
African Games medalists in athletics (track and field)
Athletes (track and field) at the 2022 Commonwealth Games
Commonwealth Games silver medallists for Botswana
Commonwealth Games medallists in athletics
Medallists at the 2022 Commonwealth Games